Timothy Stanley may refer to:

 Tim Stanley (born 1982), British journalist and historian
 Timothy Robbins Stanley (1810–1874), American Civil War officer